Liz McIntyre may refer to:

 Liz McIntyre (writer), consumer privacy expert and author
 Elizabeth McIntyre (born 1965), American skier